Từ Liêm was a rural district (huyện) of Hanoi, the capital city of Vietnam. On 27 December 2013, it was divided into two new urban districts (quận), Bắc Từ Liêm and Nam Từ Liêm.

Education 
The Japanese School of Hanoi is in Nam Từ Liêm.

References 

Former districts of Vietnam